Meier Peak is a peak rising to  at the south side of the head of Ironside Glacier,  south-southwest of Mount Minto, in the Admiralty Mountains of Antarctica. It was mapped by the United States Geological Survey from surveys and U.S. Navy air photos, 1960–63, and was named by the Advisory Committee on Antarctic Names for Lieutenant Commander Miron D. Meier, U.S. Navy Reserve, a helicopter pilot with Squadron VX-6 during Operation Deep Freeze 1967 and 1968.

References

Mountains of Victoria Land
Borchgrevink Coast